Fayzabad District may refer to:

 Fayzabad District of Badakhshan Province in eastern Afghanistan
 Fayzabad District of Jowzjan Province in northern Afghanistan